Alicia Haydock Munnell (born December 6, 1942) is an American economist who is the Peter F. Drucker Professor of Management Sciences at Boston College's Carroll School of Management. Educated at Wellesley College, Boston University, and Harvard University, Munnell spent 20 years as an economist at the Federal Reserve Bank of Boston, where she researched wealth, savings, and retirement among American workers. She served in the Bill Clinton administration as Assistant Secretary of the Treasury for Economic Policy and as a member of the Council of Economic Advisers. Since 1997 she has been a professor at Boston College and director of its Center for Retirement Research, where she writes on retirement income policy.

Early life and education 

Alicia Haydock Munnell was born December 6, 1942, in New York City. In 1964 she received a B.A. in economics from Wellesley College, where she was a member of Phi Beta Kappa. She received an M.A. in economics from Boston University in 1966 and a Ph.D. in economics from Harvard University in 1973. At Harvard she studied public and private retirement savings plans.

Career 

Munnell held a number of short-term positions before earning her doctorate. She was a teaching fellow in the economics departments of Boston University from 1965 to 1966 and Harvard University from 1971 to 1973. From 1964 to 1965 she was a staff assistant in the Business Research Division of the New England Telephone Company. From 1966 to 1968 she was a research assistant to Joseph A. Pechman, then director of the Economic Studies Program at the Brookings Institution. She also had an appointment as Assistant Professor of Economics at Wellesley in 1974.

Federal Reserve Bank of Boston 

After earning her Ph.D. in 1973, Munnell began a 20-year career at the Federal Reserve Bank of Boston. She was a research economist and was promoted to senior vice president and director of research in 1984. Her research focused primarily on the distribution of wealth and savings in the American population and the impact of retirement policies and plans. She advocated taxing benefits and contributions to private pension plans, which she viewed as providing tax breaks for the well off without increasing their saving. In 1992 she published a study that claimed Boston-area banks had practiced racial discrimination in mortgage lending against black and Hispanic applicants. The American Bankers Association and political conservatives criticized the study.

Clinton administration 

In December 1992, President-elect Bill Clinton held an economic forum in Little Rock, Arkansas, which Munnell attended. Clinton responded favorably to several of Munnell's policy proposals. By January 20, 1993, when Clinton was inaugurated, Munnell was seen as the likely choice for the post of Assistant Secretary of the Treasury for Economic Policy. Three days later, Clinton's Treasury Secretary, Lloyd Bentsen, announced her appointment to the post in an acting capacity. To formally hold the post, Munnell needed to be confirmed by the U.S. Senate. Several Republican Senators reacted negatively to the nomination, citing her views on taxing pensions. The pension industry also criticized the nomination. Nonetheless, she had the support of some Republican Senators, including David Durenberger, the ranking member of the Finance Committee, and her confirmation hearing before that committee in May 1993 was uncontroversial. She was confirmed later that month by a voice vote following floor debate in which several Republicans reiterated objections to the pension tax proposal.

As Assistant Secretary, Munnell's main role was as the chief aide to the Treasury Secretary on economic issues. However, as a senior official in the Treasury Department she worked in a number of other areas, including investment policy for private pension plans, the administration's response to the Federal Reserve's moves against inflation, and Superfund reform. Now, she argues that the best way to fix the social security funding dilemma is to raise taxes.

By February 1994, speculation had begun that Munnell could be named to the Federal Reserve Board of Governors. In May 1995, when John P. LaWare announced his retirement from the Fed Board, the Clinton administration announced its intention to appoint Munnell to fill the vacancy. However, the November 1994 election had given Republicans control of the Senate, and a group of 10 Republican Senators told the administration they would oppose her over concerns that she would not fight inflation hard enough. Her views on pensions and the mortgage discrimination study she led were also cited as reasons the lending industry pressured Republicans to oppose her. In June the administration decided to avoid a confirmation fight by naming her instead to the President's Council of Economic Advisers. The Fed Board seat remained vacant until June 1996, when the Senate confirmed Lawrence Meyer to replace LaWare.

The Washington Post reported in December 1996 that Clinton would name Munnell to head the Social Security Administration during his second term, but this did not come to pass. She left the Council of Economic Advisers in August 1997, ending her service in the Clinton administration.

Boston College 

After resigning from the Council of Economic Advisers in 1997, Munnell joined the faculty of Boston College as the Peter F. Drucker Professor of Management Sciences at the Carroll School of Management, a position she still holds. She founded BC's Center for Retirement Research the following year and has been the center's director since. She continues to publish on retirement income policy, including Social Security, employer-sponsored pension plans, and labor force activity among older workers.

Munnell was named a Fellow of the American Academy of Arts and Sciences in 1998. Alicia Munnell co-founded and became the first president of the National Academy of Social Insurance. She was the 2009 recipient of the National Academy of Social Insurance's Robert M. Ball Award for Outstanding Achievements in Social Insurance. Currently, she is currently a member of the American Academy of Arts and Sciences, Institute of Medicine, and the Pension Research Council at Wharton.

Personal life 

Munnell was first married to Thomas Clark Munnell, with whom she had two sons. They divorced, and Alicia Munnell later married Henry S. Healy. She is a member of the Democratic Party.

References

External links
Website
Center for Retirement Research at Boston College

Living people
Economists from New York (state)
American women economists
Boston College faculty
United States Department of the Treasury officials
United States Council of Economic Advisers
Wellesley College alumni
Boston University College of Arts and Sciences alumni
Harvard University alumni
1942 births
Wellesley College faculty
Federal Reserve Bank people
New York (state) Democrats
Massachusetts Democrats
Clinton administration personnel
Fellows of the American Academy of Arts and Sciences
Scientists from New York City
Scientists from Massachusetts
The Century Foundation
21st-century American economists
Economists from Massachusetts
21st-century American women
Members of the National Academy of Medicine